Parthenium incanum, with the common names mariola and New Mexico rubber plant, is a plant in the genus Parthenium of the family Asteraceae.

The plant is native to North America, from the Southwestern United States through Northern, Central, and Southwestern Mexico. Habitats include desert grasslands including in the Chihuahuan Desert, on dry gravel slopes, and on plains.

Description
Its foliage is a pubescent grayish-white. Small white flower clusters appear from July to October.

Uses

Medicinal
The Jicarilla Apache used mariola as a traditional medicinal plant. It was prepared by boiling the plant's leaves, and the solution was then was rubbed over a pregnant woman's abdomen to relieve discomfort.

Cultivation
Parthenium incanum is cultivated as an ornamental plant, for use in drought tolerant, native plant, and wildlife gardens.

References

External links
 USDA Plants Profile for Parthenium incanum (mariola)

incanum
Flora of the Southwestern United States
Flora of Mexico
Flora of New Mexico
Flora of the Chihuahuan Desert
Plants used in traditional Native American medicine
Garden plants of North America
Drought-tolerant plants
Plant dyes